Mike Sherstad (born May 18, 1965) is an American politician who served in the Washington House of Representatives from the 1st district from 1995 to 1999.

References

1965 births
Living people
Republican Party members of the Washington House of Representatives